Dudley is an unincorporated community in Lyon County, in the U.S. state of Minnesota.

History
Dudley was platted in 1902. It was named after Dudley, Massachusetts. A post office was established at Dudley in 1903, and closed in 1907.

References

Unincorporated communities in Lyon County, Minnesota
Unincorporated communities in Minnesota